The Toronto Native Sons were a Canadian junior ice hockey team in the Ontario Hockey Association (OHA) from 1933 until 1942. They played at Maple Leaf Gardens in Toronto. Prior to moving up to the OHA, the team played in the Toronto Junior Hockey League and were coached by Harold Cotton. The Native Sons were league finalists in 1938–39 for the J. Ross Robertson Cup, losing in three games to the Oshawa Generals.

Five alumni of the Native Sons graduated to play in the National Hockey League. Hockey Hall of Fame inductee Bill Quackenbush played for the team in the 1940–41 season. Other alumni include; Al Dewsbury, Red Heron, George Parsons and John Webster.

Yearly results
Results prior to 1937-38 are incomplete.

References

External links
 Maple Leaf Gardens - The OHL Arena & Travel Guide

Defunct Ontario Hockey League teams
Na
Ice hockey clubs established in 1933
Sports clubs disestablished in 1942
1933 establishments in Ontario
1942 disestablishments in Ontario